Destroyer Command is a naval simulation released by Ubi Soft in 2002 and developed by the now-defunct Ultimation Inc.

Gameplay
The game placed the player in command of a Destroyer during World War II, featuring campaigns from both the Pacific War and the Battle of the Atlantic. Customized missions may be played and players can select the opponent's forces and their own. Players can also have the chance to choose the difficulty rating in different games by adjusting the different realism ratings .

The game features two campaigns that include the entire Pacific and Atlantic warfare with 20 missions each. There are 20 predefined historical missions, for example, the 'Battle of Savo Island', additionally to some training missions, and automatically generated, customized missions.

Weaponry that can be controlled by the player are the dual purpose 5"/38 caliber gun, the 4-inch/50 SP gun, the light guns Bofors 40 mm gun and Oerlikon 20 mm cannon, 200 to 600 lb depth charges, and 21-inch torpedoes.

History
The game was developed by the Ultimation Inc. and released by Ubisoft in 2002. Due to problems with the game a patch (ver 4.10) was released in March 2002 by the developer for download.

After release, instability with the multiplayer feature was found to be commonplace, yet Ubisoft never resolved this issue by releasing another official patch. While in 2002 Ubisoft had ended the official support, they authorized and enabled the game's community at Subsim.com to fix the game themselves by giving them the source code. The fan community raised over $7000 for an unofficial patch development project called Projekt Messerwetzer which ultimately fixed the issues.

Reception

Before the release of the patch, the game received "mixed" reviews according to the review aggregation website Metacritic.

It was nominated for the "Most Disappointing Game on PC" award at GameSpots Best and Worst of 2002 Awards, which went to Civilization III: Play the World.

See also
 Silent Hunter II, released in 2001.

References

External links

 Projekt Messerwetzer An authorized community upgrade for Destroyer Command and Silent Hunter II

2002 video games
Naval video games
Ship simulation games
Ubisoft games
Video games scored by Kevin Manthei
Video games developed in the United States
Windows games
Windows-only games
World War II video games